Dean Butler (born May 20, 1956) is a Canadian-American actor and producer of entertainment, sports and documentary programming.

Biography

Early life
Born in Prince George, British Columbia, and raised in Piedmont, California, Butler studied communication arts at the University of the Pacific in Stockton, California.

Career
Butler's career as an actor started with a small part on the TV series The Streets of San Francisco. His first major role was in the 1978 TV movie Forever, based on Judy Blume's novel of the same title.

Butler is best known for his portrayal of Almanzo Wilder on the NBC family drama Little House on the Prairie, which was based on the classic Little House books by Laura Ingalls Wilder. He appeared in the final four seasons of the show, the spin-off show Little House: A New Beginning, and the three post-series TV movies. After Little House ended, he played Jeff "Moondoggie" Griffin in the TV series The New Gidget and Buffy’s dad, Hank Summers, on Buffy the Vampire Slayer.

During the 1980s and 1990s, Butler was a guest star on various television series, including Murder, She Wrote, Who's the Boss?, The Love Boat, and JAG. He co-starred with the late Gary Coleman in The Kid with the 200 I.Q.. He appeared in the movies Desert Hearts and The Final Goal.

Onstage, Butler has performed in the shows of Stephen Sondheim. He appeared on Broadway in the original company of Into the Woods as Rapunzel's Prince, internationally as Tony in West Side Story and regionally in Company.

Directing and producing
Butler now works largely behind the camera producing entertainment, sports, and documentary programming. Butler produces Feherty for Golf Channel, starring David Feherty. In addition, he is a West Coast correspondent for Broadway World, a provider of web content about the performing arts.

Butler has directed, produced, written, and narrated bonus features for Little House on the Prairie DVD collections. He narrated a six-part documentary, The Little House Phenomenon.

Butler has produced two documentaries, Little House on the Prairie: The Legacy of Laura Ingalls Wilder and Almanzo Wilder: Life Before Laura, which drew their inspiration from the Little House books of Laura Ingalls Wilder. Additionally, in 2012, Butler co-executive produced Pa's Fiddle: The Music of America for PBS.

Personal life

Butler is married to actress Katherine Cannon, who played Felice Martin on the television series Beverly Hills 90210. They met when Cannon auditioned for the female lead in the Michael Landon series Father Murphy. They live in Los Angeles, California.

Acting credits

Film

Theatre

References

External links

Dean Butler's Legacy Documentaries - a Peak Moore Enterprises, Inc. Company
About Dean Butler

1956 births
Living people
American male film actors
American male television actors
Television producers from California
People from Prince George, British Columbia
Male actors from British Columbia
Canadian emigrants to the United States
People from Piedmont, California
Male actors from the San Francisco Bay Area
Canadian male film actors
Canadian male television actors
Canadian television producers